The SSK 90 helmet was a short-lived World War II Luftwaffe helmet. Manufactured by Siemens, the helmet consisted of an inner core of interlocking steel plates, a goatskin exterior, and an underside with foam rubber padding and a cloth lining; a prominent protrusion at the front helped to put on and take off the helmet quickly, and served as extra padding in case of a crash. The helmet had cutouts for earphones, and was designed to be worn over a cloth flight helmet outfitted with radio gear.

The helmet was introduced on 8 May 1941, but quickly found unsuitable for service at the front; it was withdrawn from service only 18 days later, on 26 May. Some examples continued to be used, although pilots more frequently relied on modified versions of the M35 helmet.

Design 
The SSK 90 helmet comprised an inner steel core covered by padding and leather. On the inside, interlocking chromium-nickel steel plates, 1 millimetre thick and slightly convex, overlapped at the point of attachment; the plates were intended to protect against shrapnel and small-calibre machine-gun fire. The exterior featured dark brown goatskin leather, and a large protruding section of padding intended to help quickly don and doff the helmet, and to provide extra cushioning in the event of impact. The underside was padded with foam rubber, and lined with a brown cotton mixture. Each side of the helmet, which was designed to be worn over a cloth flight helmet outfitted with radio gear, had a cut-out for earphones. A snap-on chinstrap used the same componentsincluding buckles, leather, and snapsfound on German paratrooper helmets, although only about half of the helmets were issued with chinstraps.

The SSK 90 was extremely similar to another model, the LKH W, which differed only in its sloping neck guard, lack of chinstrap, and, frequently, an embroidered Luftwaffe eagle.

History 
The helmet was designed by Siemens, and adopted for use by the Luftwaffe on 8 May 1941. A 26 May 1941 report deemed the helmets unacceptable for service at the front, however, and they were returned to the Luftwaffe clothing office in Berlin. Instead, pilots relied on reworked M35 helmets, with bulges pressed into each side to provide space for earphones. Some helmets nonetheless continued to be used after the model was withdrawn.

Notes

References

Bibliography 

 
  
  
  
  
  

20th-century fashion
1941 introductions
Combat helmets of Germany
German military uniforms
Luftwaffe
Military equipment of World War II
Siemens products
World War II military equipment of Germany
Military equipment introduced from 1940 to 1944